This is a list of diplomatic missions of Andorra. Andorra has a limited number of diplomatic missions, with some missions to multilateral organisations also responsible to the hosted countries. Its mission in Brussels encompasses bilateral relations with the European Union, the Benelux countries, and Germany. The Andorran mission in New York City comprises the bilateral relations with the United States, Canada and Mexico, as well as represents Andorra at the UN

Europe

 Vienna (Embassy)

 Brussels (Embassy)

 Paris (Embassy)

 Lisbon (Embassy)

 Madrid (Embassy)

Gallery

Multilateral organisations
 
Strasbourg (Representation)
 
Brussels (Mission)
  Organization for Security and Co-operation in Europe
Vienna (Representation)
 
Paris (Permanent Delegation)
 
New York City (Permanent Mission)
Geneva (Permanent Mission)
  World Trade Organization
Geneva (Mission)

See also
 Foreign relations of Andorra
 List of diplomatic missions in Andorra

External links
 Ministry of Foreign Affairs

Foreign relations of Andorra
Andoraa
Diplomatic missions